Vladimir Polyanichev (born 21 April 1938) is a Soviet sprinter. He competed in the men's 4 × 400 metres relay at the 1960 Summer Olympics.

References

1938 births
Living people
Athletes (track and field) at the 1960 Summer Olympics
Soviet male sprinters
Olympic athletes of the Soviet Union
Place of birth missing (living people)